This is a list of German television related events from 2016.

Events
25 February - The Voice of Germany season 5 winner Jamie-Lee Kriewitz is selected to represent Germany at the 2016 Eurovision Song Contest with her song "Ghost". She is selected to be the sixty-first German Eurovision entry during Unser Lied für Stockholm held at the Brainpool Studios in Cologne.
25 March - 13-year-old Lukas Janisch wins the fourth season of The Voice Kids.
7 May - Prince Damien Ritzinger wins the thirteenth season of Deutschland sucht den Superstar.
3 June - Austrian pop singer Victoria Swarovski and her partner Erich Klann win the ninth season of Let's Dance.

Debuts

International
7 August -  The Cleveland Show (2009-2013) (Comedy Central)

American Forces Network
 The Loud House (2016–present) (AFN Family)

Television shows

1950s
Tagesschau (1952–present)

1960s
 heute (1963-present)

1970s
 heute-journal (1978-present)
 Tagesthemen (1978-present)

1980s
Lindenstraße (1985–present)

1990s
Gute Zeiten, schlechte Zeiten (1992–present)
Unter uns (1994-present)
Schloss Einstein (1998–present)
In aller Freundschaft (1998–present)
Wer wird Millionär? (1999-present)

2000s
Deutschland sucht den Superstar (2002–present)
Let's Dance (2006–present)
Das Supertalent (2007–present)

2010s
The Voice of Germany (2011-present)
Promi Big Brother (2013–present)

Ending this year

Births

Deaths

See also 
2016 in Germany